Fallon Municipal Airport  is two miles northeast of Fallon, in Churchill County, Nevada.

Facilities
It has two runways: 3/21 is 5,703 by 75 feet (1,738 x 23 m) asphalt; 13/31 is 4,207 by 100 feet (1,282 x 30 m) dirt.

In the year ending November 30, 2009 the airport had 6,300 aircraft operations, average 17 per day: 67% general aviation, 32% air taxi, and 2% military. 26 aircraft were then based at this airport: 77% single-engine, 4% multi-engine, and 19% ultralight.

References

External links 
  from Nevada DOT
 Aerial image as of June 1994 from USGS The National Map
 
 

Airports in Nevada
Buildings and structures in Churchill County, Nevada
Transportation in Churchill County, Nevada